The 2013 Arab Handball Championship of Club Winners' Cup is the 10th edition of the Arab Handball Championship of Winners' Cup, it's concerne Arab world's premier club handball tournament held in Marrakesh, Morocco. Al Ahly SC is the defending champion.

Venues
Salle M'hamid, Marrakesh
Salle Sidi Youssef Ben Ali, Marrakesh

Group stage

Group A

Group B

Group C

Knockout stage

Quarterfinals

Semifinals

3rd Place Match

Final

References

2013